Bernadett Budai (née Bernadett Bugyik) (born 31 March 1979) is a Hungarian politician who served as spokeswoman of the Hungarian government from June 2007 to November 2009. She is the spokeswoman of the Hungarian Socialist Party. Budai lost her parliamentary seat on the 2010 Hungarian elections.

References
 Bernadett Budai's homepage

1979 births
Living people
Politicians from Budapest
Hungarian Socialist Party politicians
Government spokespersons of Hungary
21st-century Hungarian politicians
21st-century Hungarian women politicians